Gaultiér Overman (born 15 November 2000) is a Dutch professional footballer who plays as a defender for Eredivisie club Sparta Rotterdam.

References

External links

2000 births
Living people
Dutch footballers
Footballers from Maassluis
Association football defenders
FC Dordrecht players
Sparta Rotterdam players
Eredivisie players
Eerste Divisie players
Tweede Divisie players